Martin v. Ohio, 480 U.S. 228 (1987), is a criminal case in which the United States Supreme Court held that the presumption of innocence requiring prosecution to prove each element of a crime beyond a reasonable doubt only applies to elements of the offense, and does not extend to the defense of justification, whereby states could legislate a burden on the defense to prove justification. The decision was split 5–4. The decision does not preclude states from requiring such a burden on the prosecution in their laws.

See also
 List of United States Supreme Court cases
 Lists of United States Supreme Court cases by volume
 List of United States Supreme Court cases by the Rehnquist Court

References

External links

1986 in United States case law
United States Supreme Court cases
United States Supreme Court cases of the Rehnquist Court